The Seaton Burn Wagonway (originally known as the Brunton and Shields Railway) was from 1826 to 1920 a partially horse-drawn and partially rope-operated industrial railway with a gauge of  near Newcastle upon Tyne.

History
The Brunton and Shields Railway was constructed by Benjamin Thompson on behalf of the Grand Allies and inaugurated in 1826. It followed a route from east to west via Burradon and Camperdown. Initially it did not serve the Burradon colliery, which operated a separate wagonway. It was constructed in phases starting in 1826 from the colliery in Brunton and being extended in 1837 to the bank of the River Tyne near Wallsend and North Shields. The incline planes were either self-acting like a funicular, where loaded wagons pulled the empty wagons uphill, or rope-operated like a cable railway using stationary steam engines.

Around 1867 the rail track from Seaton Burn to the coal staiths at the Tyne was re-gauged to standard gauge  so that it could be used by standard gauge colliery wagons. The Killingworth and Dinnington Colleries were connected to the line at the same time. From 1878 its name changed to Seaton Burn Wagonway. Finally, the rail track towards Backworth was built, to provide access to the Blyth and Tyne Railway, which was owned by the North Eastern Railway in the 1920s.

Operation 

The Brunton and Shields Railway had five continuous incline planes worked by stationary engines. The method of drawing goods on railways by means of stationary engines and ropes, called the reciprocating plan of conveyance, was invented and patented by Benjamin Thompson. Only one of the five incline planes was operated by the reciprocating plan of conveyance.

Steam engines were placed at intervals of  along the whole line of the railway. Ropes ran on rollers, placed between the rails, from one engine to the other, to draw the waggons forward. When a train of waggons left a station, it took along with it another rope, called the tail rope, which served to bring back the next train which was moving in the contrary direction. The rope which drew the first train then became the tail rope, and was drawn back by the former, which then became the head rope.

The Brunton and Shields Railway had only a single line of rails with a passing place at the engine stations. A speed of 10-12 mph (16–19 km/h) or more could be maintained during the time the carriages were in motion. However, the stoppages in changing ropes and crossing from one way to the other at the engine stations reduced the average speed, as shown in the following table, taken during experiments with a gross load of 31 tons on a windy day:

On three of the incline planes the loaded waggons ran themselves, and the rope was merely used to draw back the empty ones, and on the other the full waggons were drawn up, and the empty ones ran back with the rope. On four of the planes only one rope was used, because the gravity of the waggons dispensed with the other. This mode was highly advantageous, in point of simplicity and economy, when compared with the reciprocating system, where two ropes to each train were required.

Remains

Further literature

References 

Rail transport in Tyne and Wear
Defunct railroads